Leamington Royals are a rugby league team based in Royal Leamington Spa, Warwickshire, England. They play in the Midlands Rugby League Division Two.

History
Leamington Royals were formed in 2009. The club were accepted into the Midlands Rugby League for the 2009 season. The first ever league fixture was played on 10 May 2009 against Birmingham Bulldogs with Birmingham winning 42 - 32. The Royals recorded their first victory Four weeks later against Leicester Phoenix. The club went on to play a further seven fixtures in 2009 finishing 3rd overall and reached the play-off semi-finals.

In 2010, the club moved up a league into the Rugby League Conference Midlands regional division. The Royals' 10 wins from 12 games saw the club finish top of the division and into the Midlands Grand final against Telford Raiders. Leamington beat Telford in the final held at the Crofts and topped off the season by being crowned Warwick District Council 'Team of the Year' in its annual sports awards.

This season (2013) saw the move from Old Leamingtonians Rugby Union Club to the Royals' new home at Acre Close in Whitnash, in a partnership with Whitnash Sports & Social Club (www.whitnashssc.co.uk). Rhys Horton has been given the honour of captaining the side in only his second season playing rugby league.

Club Honours
 RLC Midlands Regional Champions: 2010
 RLC Midlands Rugby League Division 2 Champions: 2013
 Kukri Midlands Rugby League Semi-Finalists: 2009
 Warwick District Team of the Year 2010

Outside Honours
 Ash Howlett - Pioneer of the year 2009
 Gaz Renowden - Kukri merit league Player of the year 2009
 Gregg Swinburn - Under 18's West Midlands Vice Captain
 Gregg Swinburn- Welsh Students Trialist
 Mark Finch - Great Britain Police Representative

Players Honours
Coaches
 Coaches Player of the year 2009 - John Cooper
 Coaches Player of the year 2010 - Kyle Bowles
 Coaches Player of the year 2011 - Ryan Oliver
 Coaches Player of the year 2012 -
 Coaches Player of the year 2013 -

Captains
 Captains Player of the year 2009 - Ryan Oliver
 Captains Player of the year 2010 - Chris Murphy
 Captains Player of the year 2011 - Steve Alford
 Captains Player of the year 2012 -
 Captains Player of the year 2013 -

Man of steel
 Man of steel 2009 - Marcus Pask
 Man of steel 2010 - Ian Grimes
 Man of steel 2011 - Chris Dixon
 Man of steel 2012 -
 Man of steel 2013 - Lloyd Horton

Players
 Players Player of the year 2009 - Gaz Renounden
 Players Player of the year 2010 - Matt Timlin
 Players Player of the year 2011 - Steve Alford
 Players Player of the year 2012 -
 Players Player of the year 2013 - Paul Salvin

Young Player
 Young Player of the year 2009 - Gregg Swinburn
 Young Player of the year 2010 - Steve Ewall
 Young Player of the year 2011 - Will Cox
 Young Player of the year 2012 - Alex Mills-Baker
 Young Player of the year 2013 -

Team Player
 Team Player of the year 2011 - Jamie Dewhurst
 Team Player of the year 2012 -
 Team Player of the year 2013 -

Most Improved Player
 Most Improved Player of the year 2010 - Mark Baldwin
 Most Improved Player of the year 2011 - Matthew Haselden
 Most Improved Player of the year 2012 - John Wheelhouse
 Most Improved Player of the year 2013 - Rhys Horton

Club man
 Club man of the year 2010 - Garry Swinburn
 Club man of the year 2011 - Gaz Nash
 Club man of the year 2012 - Lloyd Shorton
 Club man of the year 2013 - Mark Finch

Juniors
Leamington Royals' juniors take part in the Midlands Junior League.

External links
 Official site

Rugby League Conference teams
Rugby league teams in Warwickshire
Rugby clubs established in 2009